Miagao (also written Miag-ao), officially the Municipality of Miagao, is a 1st class municipality in the province of Iloilo, Philippines. According to the 2020 census, it has a population of 68,115 people.

Miagao is considered as the "Onion Capital of the Visayas". The town center of the municipality lies on the western bank of the Tumagbok River, the largest river in the municipality. The poblacion is made up of eight barangays.

The town holds their patronal fiesta in honor of St. Thomas of Villanova (more commonly known as Santo Tomas de Villanueva) every September 22 that lasts several days. The town is also the location of one of the Baroque Churches of the Philippines, the Miagao Church, which was inscribed as a UNESCO World Heritage Site. The entire town of Miagao was later inscribed as a UNESCO World Heritage City and became a member of the Organization of World Heritage Cities (OWHC).

Etymology
The name of Miagao has many disputed etymologies. One of the most popular, and probably the most widely accepted version is that the name of the town was derived from a plant named Miagos. Miagos or Osmoxylon lineare is a flowering plant from the family Araliaceae that used to grow abundantly in the area when the Spaniards came. Because of its abundance in the area, the Spaniards named the place Miagos which later became Miagao. Another version, according to Rev. Fr. Lorenzo Torres of Igbaras, is that a native named "Miyagaw" was asked by the Spaniards for the name of the place but gave his name instead.

History

A settlement in Damilisan were recorded by Spanish Map early in 1700 with 13,493 people and 2,974 houses. Miagao gained its independence as a municipality in 1716 . Prior to that, it used to be a part of an arrabal of four different towns in southern Iloilo. Until 1580, Miagao was an arrabal of Oton. From 1580 until 1652, it was an arrabal of Tigbauan. It was an arrabal of Suaraga (now San Joaquin) from 1652 to 1703 and before becoming independent, it became an arrabal of Guimbal from 1703 to 1716. In 1731, Miagao had its first capitan and teniente mayor (now equivalent to mayor and vice mayor) after an election was held in Guimbal under the supervision of Victorino C. Ma., an authorized representative of the governor.

Geography

Topography
Miagao is a coastal town with a hilly to mountainous terrain. Most of the flat areas in the municipality are found either in coasts or along the town's major rivers which include the Naulid, Tumagbok, Oyaoy, Bacauan, Tabunacan, Oyungan, Lanutan, and San Rafael rivers. A mountain range forms a natural boundary between Miagao and the province of Antique to the north.

The highest point in the municipality is the summit of Mount Tulajon, locally spelled as Tulahong, at 1,100 meters asl located in Barangay Ongyod.

Climate

The municipality has a type I climate based on PAGASA's climate classification chart. The climate of Miagao is greatly affected by north-east and south-west monsoons. The town experiences a pronounced wet season from May to October and a dry season from November to April. The coolest months are the months of December to February while the hottest months are the months of April and May.

Barangays

Miagao is politically subdivided into 119 barangays. It has more barangays than any other municipality in the Philippines. The municipality has 22 coastal barangays and 97 landlocked barangays.

Demographics

As of the 2015 census by the Philippine Statistics Authority Census of Population, the ten most populous barangays of Miagao are shown in the table below:

Almost all people in Miagao speak Kinaray-a as it is the primary language of the municipality. Hiligaynon is spoken as a second language by many and is especially useful when going to Iloilo City where Hiligaynon is the dominant language.

Healthcare 

The municipality's healthcare services is under the management of the Miagao Municipal Health Office (MHO), headed by its Municipal Health Officer, Rural Health Physicians, Nurses, Midwives, and other allied health workers and staff. The MHO is directly under the administration of the Local Government Unit.

The Municipal Health Office ensures that the delivery of basic services and provisions of adequate facilities relative to health services provided under Section 17 of the Universal Healthcare Law of the Philippines (Population-based Health Services) are effectively implemented.

The main components of the Municipal Health Office include the following:
MHO Office including the headquarters of its different health programs
First-aid Clinic
Out-patient Clinic
Birthing Clinic
Animal Bite Treatment Center
DOTS Center and COVID-19 Swabbing Center
The 19 Barangay Health Stations (BHS) spread across the municipality
The Main Health Center (MHC) caters to three BHS, namely: MHC-A, MHC-B, and MHC-C

There are also other private medical, dental and veterinary clinics, laboratories, and pharmacies located primarily in the poblacion area.

Economy

Agriculture

The municipality of Miagao is a largely agricultural town. Around 52% of the municipal land area is classified as agricultural and around 40% of the total land area is planted. Rice is the primary crop of the town while corn is considered as a secondary crop. Miagao is hailed as the "Onion Capital of the Visayas" because it is the largest producer of bulb onion not only in Western Visayas but in the whole Visayas and Mindanao. Other crops produced by the municipality include eggplants, peanuts, monggo, tomatoes, root crops, and bamboo.

Banks
Miagao is a financial center in southern Iloilo. The town has a total of five banks.

The instance of these ATMs being offline is quite high due to poor maintenance, overuse (due to proximity from UP Visayas, 4Ps beneficiaries and people here withdrawing huge sums of money), and faulty Internet and power connections. Avoid withdrawing near and after the 15th and 30th days of the month because people will drain the machines with cash because it is payday, also avoid the Land Bank ATM during the 2nd-3rd week of the month because of 4Ps beneficiaries claiming their monthly government dole out. If it is a real necessity to use ATMs at these times, prepare for queues that may last for hours, people holding "reservations" in their spot, people cutting in line, and the tinge of disappointment when the machine suddenly switches offline after the business day either because it ran out of cash or overused.

Infrastructure

Public Transport
Miagao is strategically located along the Iloilo-Antique road. Because of this, transportation is not a big problem in the municipality.

Buses
Several bus companies operate in Miagao. Buses that ply the Iloilo-Antique, Iloilo-Caticlan via San Jose, and Iloilo-Manila routes pass by the municipality every day. Ceres Liner by Vallacar Transit passes by Miagao almost every 30 minutes on its way to Iloilo from Antique and vice versa.

Manila bound buses also pass by Miagao. Dimple Star Transport, Gasat/Valisno Transport, and Ceres Liner pass by Miagao every morning on their way to Manila. In addition, RM Liner also heads to Manila everyday but passes by Miagao early in the evening.

Jeepneys
Jeepneys serve the Miagao-Iloilo City route more frequently than buses. The typical jeepney can contain around 22 to as many as 34 or more passengers. The town is mainly served by Miagao-Iloilo City bound jeepneys but San Joaquin-Iloilo City bound jeepneys also serve the area. These jeepneys generally pass by every 10–20 minutes so catching a jeepney bound for Iloilo City is not a problem.
Several mountain barangays of Miagao are also served by jeepneys because smaller modes of transportation aren't usually strong enough to climb steep and unpaved roads. In that case, habal-habal or plain motocycles can also be used.

Jeepneys serving the hinterlands of the municipality include regular routes from the poblacion area to the following barangays:
Miagao - Tiglawa/Banga via Banbanan/Cavite
Miagao - San Jose via Banbanan
Miagao - Tigmarabo via Banbanan/Oya-oy
Miagao - Tig-amaga/Pudpud via Ticdalan
Miagao - Tigmalapad/Igbita
Miagao - Bacolod (barangay)
Miagao - Dalije via Bacolod
Miagao - Alimodias via Olango/Bacolod (rainy season) or via Pudpud (dry season)
Miagao - Tigbagacay/Naclub
Miagao - Maricolcol/Baraclayan

Tricycles
Tricycles are the most common form transportation in the municipality. These are the Philippines' version of tuk-tuk in other Asian countries. Tricycles are often limited to operate within the municipality but special and private trips to other places are allowed.
Miagao has established several tricycle routes in the municipality. Tricycles are color-coded to indicate the route assigned to them. Yellow ones are northbound while blue ones are southbound. Green tricycles are bound to the mountain barangays of the town passing through barangay Mat-y. Tricycles assigned to operate within the town proper are colored red. The following table shows the routes of all tricycles-for-hire within the municipality of Miagao.

Government
As with other municipal/city level political administration in the country, Miagao is governed by popularly elected Mayor, Vice Mayor, and eight Sangguniang Bayan (SB) Members. The current government officials of the municipality are listed below.

Elected officials
Members of the municipal council (2022-2028):
 Mayor: ENGR. Oscar "Richard" S. Garin Jr.
 Vice Mayor: Macario Napulan, M.D.
 SB Members:
 Hon. Japhet Grace N. Moleta, RN, MPG
 Hon. Jun Carlu A. Napulan, MD.
 Hon. Gemma Rei S. Nismal
 Hon. Aaron M. Noble
 Hon. Cezar N. Florece
 Hon. Mario Thomas Nicolas P. Torrecampo
 Hon. Ma. Salve N. Pechayco, MD
 Hon. Richard E. Esposo
 Ex-Officio Member
 Junjun Galvez (LNB President)

Highlights

Miag-ao Church

The Miagao Church, or the Church of Santo Tomas de Villanueva, was built in 1786 by Spanish Augustinian missionaries and was declared as part of the UNESCO World Heritage Site "Baroque Churches of the Philippines" in 1993. On the front facade, which is flanked by two watchtower belfries, one can see the unique blending of Spanish and native influences.

The central feature of the bas-relief facade is a large coconut tree which reaches almost to the apex. While an integral part of the Philippine landscape, the coconut tree is also the subject of lore. According to an old Philippine legend, the coconut tree was the only bequest from a loving mother to her two children, a tree which sustained them for life. On the church's facade the coconut tree appears as the "tree of life" to which St. Christopher carrying the Child Jesus on his shoulder is clinging to. The lesser facades feature the daily life of Miagaowanons during the time. Also depicted are other native flora and fauna, as well as native dress.

The church and its watchtowers were also built to defend the town and its people against raids by the Moro people. It therefore has thick walls and, reportedly, secret passages. Indeed, stretching along the Iloilo coast are defensive towers, but none that equal the size of the Miagao. It is because of this defensive purpose that it is sometimes referred to as the Miag-ao Fortress Church.

Education

The primary and secondary education in the municipality of Miagao is under the jurisdiction of the Division of Iloilo under the Department of Education Region 6. Miagao is subdivided into two school districts namely, Miagao East and Miagao West. The schools under each district as well as private, secondary, and tertiary schools in the municipality are listed below.

Elementary education

Miagao East elementary schools:

Miagao West elementary schools:

Private primary schools:
Kaunlaran Learning Center (KLC)
Acorn Dale Montessori

Secondary education
Secondary schools:
 Alejandro Firmeza Memorial NHS
 Bacolod NHS
 Kirayan NHS
 Miagao NHS
 Palaca-Damilisan NHS
 San Jose NHS
 San Rafael NHS
 Supt. Arsenio M. Napud Memorial NHS

Private secondary schools:
 Doanne Christian Fellowship Academy
 Kaunlaran Integrated School Foundation INC
 St. Louise de Marillac School of Miagao

Colleges and Universities

University of the Philippines Visayas

The Miagao campus of the University of the Philippines Visayas (UPV) spreads out over 12 km2 on the outskirts of the town proper. This is the main campus of UPV which is composed of the UPV Tacloban College (UPVTC) in Tacloban City, UPV College of Management (CM) in Iloilo City, UPV High School in Iloilo (UPVHSI) in Iloilo City, UPV College of Arts and Sciences (CAS), UPV School of Technology (SoTech), and the flagship college of this campus, the UPV College of Fisheries and Ocean Sciences (CFOS) which focuses on marine science, aquaculture, fish processing, natural products development, and post-harvest/food science. In the late 1970s and early 1980s, Thailand and Cambodia sent exchange students to the school to study fish and rice production, and after graduating returned home where they began out-producing and out-exporting the Philippines in these commodities.

Iloilo Science and Technology University - Miagao Campus

The Iloilo Science and Technology University - Miagao Campus (formerly Southern Iloilo Polytechnic College) is one of the tertiary institutions in the municipality. The college started as Miagao Regional High School in 1945 and became the Miagao Vocational School in 1958. In 1984, Miagao Vocational School was converted to Southern Iloilo Polytechnic College (SIPC) to meet the demands of the changing times and for expansion purposes. SIPC was then integrated to Western Visayas College of Science and Technology (now Iloilo Science and Technology University) on November 24, 2000, by virtue of the Republic Act(RA) No. 7722, otherwise known as the “Higher Education Act of 1994 and RA No. 8292". Currently, the school offers courses in the fields of electronics and technology, hospitality, and primary and secondary education.

Media
DYUP-FM 102.7 
DYUP-AM 873
Hot-FM Miag-ao
Falconite – FM/AM Miagao

See also
 Baroque Churches of the Philippines

References

External links

 
 [ Philippine Standard Geographic Code]
Local Governance Performance Management System

Municipalities of Iloilo